Giving Something Back is a live album recorded by Jimmie's Chicken Shack during the summer of 1995. The recordings are from two shows, one at Graffiti's (21 August 1995) and one at Hammerjacks (17 July 1995). The material on the album comes from 2 for 1 Special and early versions of songs from Pushing the Salmanilla Envelope.

Track listing
All tracks by Jimmies Chicken Shack
 Sitting with the Dog - 4:05
 Hole - 2:01
 Outhouse - 3:11
 Inside - 4:43
 Milk - 4:42
 Vacuum - 3:16
 Return to Sender - 3:12
 Another Day - 3:02
 High - 3:54
 Blood - 3:31
 Virginia County Line - 3:03
 When You Die Your Dead - 2:40
 Noseface - 3:17
 Bliss - 4:16
 React/Get Off/Again - 12:19

Personnel
Jimi Haha - Guitar, Vocals
Che' Lemon - Bass
Jim McD - Guitar, Backing Vocals
Jim Chaney - Drums

1995 albums
Jimmie's Chicken Shack albums